The 2007 Hamburg Sea Devils season was the third and final season for the franchise in the NFL Europa League (NFLEL). The team was led by head coach Vince Martino in his first year, and played its home games at AOL Arena in Hamburg, Germany. They finished the regular season in first place with a record of seven wins and three losses. Hamburg won the first championship in team history by defeating the Frankfurt Galaxy 37–28. The National Football League (NFL) announced the closure of its European branch on June 29.

Offseason

Free agent draft

Personnel

Staff

Roster

Schedule

Standings

Game summaries

Week 1: vs Cologne Centurions

Week 2: at Berlin Thunder

Week 3: at Frankfurt Galaxy

Week 4: vs Rhein Fire

Week 5: vs Amsterdam Admirals

Week 6: at Amsterdam Admirals

Week 7: vs Berlin Thunder

Week 8: at Cologne Centurions

Week 9: vs Frankfurt Galaxy

Week 10: at Rhein Fire

World Bowl XV

Honors
Throughout the course of the 10-week regular season, eight players earned player of the week accolades: Adam Anderson (special teams, Week 7), Casey Bramlet (offense, Week 4), Gary Gibson (defense, Week 4), Byron Hardmon (defense, Week 5), Ben Ishola (national, Weeks 2 and 8), Justin Jenkins (offense, Week 3), Scott McCready (national, Weeks 1, 4 and 10), and Rich Parson (special teams, Week 3).

After the completion of the regular season, the All-NFL Europa League team was selected by the NFLEL coaching staffs, members of a media panel and fans voting online at NFLEurope.com. Overall, Hamburg had eight players selected. The selections were:

 Gary Gibson, defensive tackle
 Ben Ishola, national defensive player
 Justin Kurpeikis, defensive end
 Shawn Mayer, safety
 Marcus Maxwell, wide receiver
 Scott McCready, national offensive player
 Pete McMahon, guard
 Jeremy Parquet, tackle

Head coach Vince Martino was named NFLEL Coach of the Year after leading his team to a first title game appearance in team history. Additionally, quarterback Casey Bramlet earned World Bowl MVP honors.

Notes

References

Hamburg
Hamburg Sea Devils seasons